Courtice is a surname.

Notable people with this surname include:
 Ben Courtice, Australian politician
 Brian Courtice, Australian politician
 Frederick Colin Courtice, Australian scientist
 Frederick Courtice, Australian politician
 Julianne Courtice, English squash player
 Polly Courtice, British academic
 Rody Kenny Courtice, Canadian painter
 Thomas Courtice, American academic administrator